This is a sub-article to Białystok
Białystok, Poland, is home to one principal public university (University of Białystok) and two other public specialist universities (Białystok Technical University and Medical University of Białystok). Some institutions, such as Musical Academy in Bialystok, are branches of their parent institutions in other cities, usually in Warsaw. Since the fall of communism many private-funded institutions of higher educations were founded and their number is still increasing.

Public-funded institutes of higher education

University of Białystok
The University of Bialystok was created under the Act of Sejm of the Republic of Poland on June 19, 1997 from the Branch of Warsaw University after 29 years of its existence. The academic potential and scope of the new University’s activities have contributed to its present position as one of the biggest and most important academic centers in the Northern Eastern Poland. Though now an independent academic center, The University of Bialystok still maintains scientific and personal connections with Warsaw University.

Białystok Technical University
Białystok Technical University, the first technical college in Białystok, was opened on December 1, 1949 as a Private Evening Engineering College with the departments of Mechanical and Electrical Engineering, and nationalised in 1951,  Bialystok University of Technology acquired its university status in 1974. It is the largest university of its kind in Poland’s north-eastern region.

 Medical University of Białystok
 Musical Academy in Białystok (Akademia Muzyczna w Białymstoku) http://chopin.man.bialystok.pl
 Akademia Teatralna 
 Archidiecezjalne wyższe Seminarium Duchowne
 Instytut Nauk Politycznych (Filia w Białymstoku)
 Nauczycielskie Kolegium Rewalidacji i Resocjalizacji
 Papieski Wydział Teologiczny (Studium Teologii)

Private institutes of higher education

 Białystok School of Public Administration (Wyższa Szkoła Administracji Publicznej)
 Białystok Institute of Cosmetology (Wyższa Szkoła Kosmetologii w Białymstoku)
 Academy of Economics in Białystok (Wyższa Szkoła Ekonomiczna w Białymstoku)
 Academy of Finance and Management in Białystok (Wyższa Szkoła Finansów i Zarządzania w Białymstoku)
 Academy of Mathematics and Consumer IT (Wyższa Szkoła Matematyki i Informatyki Użytkowej)
 Niepaństwowa Wyższa Szkoła Pedagogiczna
 Academy of Management in Bialystok (Wyższa Szkoła Menedżerska)
 Niepubliczne Nauczycielskie Kolegium Języków Obcych
 Nauczycielskie Kolegium Języków Obcych "Inter - Lingua" 
 Wyższa Szkoła Gospodarowania Nieruchomościami (Bialystok branch) 
 Academy of Physical Education and Tourism in Bialystok (Wyższa Szkoła Wychowania Fizyczneo i Turystyki w Białymstoku)

High schools
VI High School - King Sigismund Augustus

References

 
Universities and colleges in Poland